The Távoras affair was a political scandal of the 18th century Portuguese court. The events triggered by the attempted assassination of King Joseph I of Portugal in 1758 ended with the public execution of the entire Távora family and their closest relatives in 1759. Some historians interpret the incident as an attempt by prime minister Sebastião de Melo (later Marquis of Pombal) to curb the growing powers of the old aristocratic families.

Prelude
In the aftermath of the Lisbon earthquake on 1 November 1755, which destroyed the royal palace, King Joseph I of Portugal took up residence in a tent complex in Ajuda, on the outskirts of the city. This was the centre of Portuguese political and social life at the time. The king lived surrounded by his staff, led by the prime minister, Sebastião José de Carvalho e Melo, and was attended by members of the nobility. 

The prime minister was a strict man, son of a country squire, with a grudge against the old nobility, who despised him. Clashes between them were frequent and tolerated by the king, who trusted Sebastião de Melo for his competent leadership after the earthquake.

King Joseph I was married to Mariana Victoria of Spain, Infanta of Spain, and had four daughters. Despite an attested happy family life (the king loved his daughters and enjoyed playing with them and taking them on nature walks), Joseph I had a favourite mistress: Teresa Leonor, wife of Luis Bernardo, heir of the Távora family. 

Luis Bernardo's parents, Marquise Leonor Tomásia de Távora, and her husband, Francisco Assis, Count of Alvor and former viceroy of India, headed one of the most powerful families in the kingdom. They were related to the houses of Aveiro, Cadaval, and Alorna. They were also among the bitterest enemies of Sebastião de Melo. Leonor of Távora was politically influential, preoccupied with the affairs of the kingdom handed to, from her perspective, an upstart with no education. She was also a devout Catholic with strong ties to the Jesuits, including her personal confessor, Gabriel Malagrida.

Assassination attempt

On the night of 3 September 1758, Joseph I was riding in an unmarked carriage on a secondary, unfrequented road on the outskirts of Lisbon. The king was returning to the tents of Ajuda after an evening with his mistress. Somewhere along the way two or three men intercepted the carriage and fired on its occupants. Joseph I was shot in the arm and his driver was badly wounded, but both survived and returned to Ajuda.

Sebastião de Melo took control of the situation. Concealing the attack and the king's injuries, he initiated a swift inquiry. A few days later two men were arrested for the shootings and tortured. The men confessed their guilt and stated that they were following the orders of the Távora family, who were plotting to put the Duke of Aveiro on the throne. Both men were hanged the following day, even before the attempted regicide was made public.

Arrests, trial and sentence 
In the following weeks the Marchioness Leonor of Távora, her husband the Count of Alvor, and all of their sons, daughters, and grandchildren were imprisoned. Alleged conspirators, the Duke of Aveiro and the Távoras' sons-in-law, the Marquis of Alorna, and the Count of Atouguia, were arrested with their families. Gabriel Malagrida, the Jesuit confessor of Leonor of Távora, was also arrested. 

All were accused of high treason and attempted regicide. The evidence presented in their common trial was simple: a) the confessions of the executed assassins; b) the murder weapon belonging to the Duke of Aveiro; and c) the assumption that only the Távoras would have known the whereabouts of the king on that evening since he was returning from a liaison with Teresa of Távora (who was also arrested). The Távoras denied all charges but were eventually sentenced to death. Their estates were confiscated by the crown, their palace in Lisbon destroyed and its soil salted, their name erased from the peerage and their coat-of-arms outlawed. 

The original sentence ordered the execution of entire families, including women and children. Only the intervention of Queen Mariana and Maria Francisca, heiress to the throne, saved most of them.

The Marchioness, however, was not spared. She and the other defendants sentenced to death were publicly tortured and executed on 13 January 1759, in a field near Lisbon. The king was present with his bewildered court. The Távoras were their peers and kin, but the prime minister wanted the lesson driven home.
Afterward, the ground was salted, to prevent future growth of vegetation. To this day, in this location there remains an alley called Beco do Chão Salgado ("alley of the salted ground"); on its corner stands a shame memorial with an inscription just below waist height, overlooked by no saints' statues in niches - this disposition effectively converted the memorial into a popular public urinal.
The inscription on the monument (translated to English) reads: In this place were razed to the ground and salted the houses of José Mascarenhas, stripped of the honours of Duque de Aveiro and others, convicted by sentence proclaimed in the Supreme Court of Inconfidences on the 12th of January 1759. Brought to Justice as one of the leaders of the most barbarous and execrable upheaval that, on the night of the 3rd of September 1758, was committed against the most royal and sacred person of the Lord Joseph I. On this infamous land nothing may be built for all time.

Aftermath 

Gabriel Malagrida was burned at the stake in September 1761 and the Jesuit Order outlawed that same year. All its estates were confiscated and all Jesuits expelled from Portuguese territory, both in Europe and the colonies.

The Alorna family and the daughters of the Duke of Aveiro were sentenced to life imprisonment in various monasteries and convents. 

Sebastião de Melo was made Count of Oeiras for his competent handling of the affair, and later, in 1770, was promoted to Marquis of Pombal, the name by which he is known today.

Discussion
The guilt or innocence of the Távoras is still debated today by Portuguese historians. On the one hand, the tense relations between the aristocracy and the king are well documented. The lack of a male heir to the throne displeased most of them and, indeed, the Duke of Aveiro was a possible candidate for succession.

On the other hand, some refer to a convenient coincidence: with the conviction of the Távoras and the Jesuits, all enemies of Sebastião de Melo disappeared and the nobility was tamed. Moreover, the Távoras' defenders argue that the attempted murder of Joseph I might have been a random attack by highway robbers since the king was travelling without guard or sign of rank on a dangerous Lisbon road. Another clue to possible innocence is the fact that none of the Távoras or their allies tried to escape from Portugal in the days following the attack.

See also
A-dos-Ruivos — The village where the Távora family took refuge when they were being pursued by the Marquis of Pombal.

References

1758 in Portugal
1759 in Portugal
Portuguese nobility